The United States Lighthouse Tender Warrington was a lighthouse tender which served on the Great Lakes.  She was built as a steam barge in 1868, and began life under the name Henry Warrington.  Rechristened simply Warrington, she began government service late in 1870, and was soon pressed into service supporting the construction of the Spectacle Reef Light on Lake Huron.  On one of her trips across the lake, during a late-fall storm, she encountered the schooner Darien, which was breaking up on the shore; the Warrington'''s crew managed to turn towards the wounded vessel and rescued her entire crew.

The Warrington'' received a new boiler in 1871, and was replanked in 1878.  She continued service into the 1890s, being completely rebuilt in 1897.  She was decommissioned and sold in 1910, when she was purchased by a Chicago lumber company.  She served to carry lumber around the lakes until running aground near Charlevoix in a storm on August 21, 1911; so battered was the ship by the waves that she was considered a complete loss.

External links
US Coast Guard history
Seeing the Light page

Lighthouse tenders of the United States
1868 ships